Bohdalovice is a municipality and village in Český Krumlov District in the South Bohemian Region of the Czech Republic. It has about 300 inhabitants.

Administrative parts
Villages of Kaliště, Slavkov, Slubice, Suš and Svéraz are administrative parts of Bohdalovice.

References

Villages in Český Krumlov District